Cheeca Rocks is a shallow coral reef (patch reef) located within the Florida Keys National Marine Sanctuary. It lies approximately one mile to the southeast of Upper Matecumbe Key.  This reef lies within a Sanctuary Preservation Area (SPA).

External links
 Benthic Habitat Map

References
 NOAA National Marine Sanctuary Maps, Florida Keys East
 NOAA website on Cheeca Rocks

Coral reefs of the Florida Keys